Kareh Rud (also Romanized as Kareh Rūd) is a village in Jirandeh Rural District, Amarlu District, Rudbar County, Gilan Province, Iran. At the 2006 census, its population was 37, in 10 families.

References 

Populated places in Rudbar County